Bill Whitfield (1884–1958) was an Australian rugby league footballer who played in the 1900s and 1910s.  He played for North Sydney in the NSWRL competition and was a foundation player of the club.

Playing career
Whitfield played in North Sydney's first ever game against South Sydney on April 20 1908 at Birchgrove Oval.

Whitfield played 3 games for New South Wales between 1908 and 1909 and played 1 match for Australia in 1909.

References

North Sydney Bears players
Rugby league players from Sydney
Rugby league fullbacks
1884 births
1958 deaths
Place of birth missing
New South Wales rugby league team players